The Honda CRF450R is a four-stroke racing motocross motorcycle built by Honda Motor Company.  It is the successor to the Honda CR250R two-stroke.

The Honda CRF450X is the enduro version of the Honda CRF450R.

Notable changes

First generation: 2002–2004

The CRF450R was introduced in 2002. Unlike the competing Yamaha YZ426, the first generation CRF450R has an aluminum frame. In 2003, Honda added a longer shock and new linkage to raise the rear end and steepen the head angle. In 2003, camshaft, exhaust, and ignition map were revised.

Second generation: 2005–2008

The second generation CRF450R had a redesigned motor and frame with new bodywork styling from the new CRF250R.  In 2008, the Honda Progressive Steering Damper (HPSD) was introduced, allowing the steering geometry to be more aggressive.

Third generation: 2009–2012

The third generation CRF450R had fuel-injection and an all-new bike to match.

Fourth generation: 2013–2016

The fourth  generation of the CRF450R introduced a new twin-exhaust to centralize mass. Also new to the fourth generation were air forks.

Fifth generation: 2017–2020
The 2017 CRF450R offers a new engine design and optional electric start. The air forks were switched out in favor of Showa coil spring forks.

The 2018 offers standard electric start and new engine mount offer most chassis flex.

The 2019 CRF450R features an all-new swing-arm and a launch control setting.

Sixth generation: 2021–present

New slimmer frame and plastic design, single exhaust ported through center of the upright. The exhaust port is now oval instead of round.

See also
Honda CRF series

References

CRF450R
Motocross
Motorcycles introduced in 2002